The Hundred of Murray is a cadastral hundred in the County of Robinson, South Australia. It occupies land midway between the towns of Streaky Bay and Poochera.

The hundred was proclaimed on 6 December 1888 by Governor William Robinson.

History
The traditional owners of the area are the Wirangu and Nauo people, both speakers of the Wirangu language. The first European to sight the area was Matthew Flinders in 1802 on his voyage aboard the Investigator. The first European land exploration was that of John Hill and Samuel Stephens in 1839, followed by Edward John Eyre in the same year.

References

Murray